The eleventh election to Cardiganshire County Council took place in March 1922. It was preceded by the 1919 election and followed by the 1925 election.

Boundary changes
A revision of the ward boundaries in Aberystwyth resulted in the creation of six wards instead of four, thus increasing the number of elected councillors from 48 to 50. The number of aldermen remained unchanged at 16.

Candidates

When the nominations eventually closed there were contests in 24 of the 26 divisions. The early 1920s saw a deep division in Liberal ranks in Cardiganshire, and this was reflected in the large number of contested elections, including contests between rival Liberal factions. However, neither of the two rival Liberal Associations, or the Conservative Association, took an active role in the election, and the Labour Party did not field any candidates.

In many communities, meetings of electors were held prior to the election, and some of these led to the nominated candidate being returned unopposed. An interesting case arose at Bow Street, where a meeting expressed dissatisfaction with Sir Lewes Loveden Price of Gogerddan, who was said to have only attended two council meetings in two years.

Retiring aldermen

Seven aldermen retired, all of whom had been elected as Liberals, and there was also a vacancy following the death of James Stephens (Llechryd). Two of their number, John Morgan Howell (Aberaeron) and Rev T. Arthur Thomas (Llandysul) contested the election. The other retiring aldermen were J.W. Davies (Llangybi), Peter Jones (Aberystwyth), C.M. Williams (Aberystwyth), J.T. Morgan (Llandre) and Thomas Morgan (Ysbyty Ystwyth).  Aldermen Howell, Jones, J.T. Morgan and Williams had served as members of the council since its formation but the latter three had not faced the electorate for many years.

Contested elections

Most of the 24 contests were said to have been "strenuous and exciting". It was stated that the bitterest fights were between candidates of the same political persuasion.

Relatively few of the retiring members were defeated, although a prominent casualty was John Humphreys Davies, principal of the University College at Aberystywth, who was defeated at Llangeitho by a Coalition Liberal

Outcome
The deep schism in the Liberal ranks, as a result of two Liberal factions fighting each other at the Cardiganshire parliamentary by-election the previous year, was reflected in many of the local contests at the election. In contrast, however, many of the contests were personal ones, and in some cases the political labels were irrelevant, especially where candidates of the same political persuasion fought each other. The number of contest fought on traditional Liberal versus Conservative lines was small and many of those members returned unopposed did not declare their political allegiance. In reality, therefore, the 1922 elections inaugurated a new era in Cardiganshire politics where the vast majority of councillors would be elected as Independents. Of the 24 elected members, x were Coalition (or National) Liberals, y were Independent (or Asquithian) Liberals while z were Conservatives.

Results

Aberaeron

Aberbanc

Aberporth

Aberystwyth Division 1

Aberystwyth Division 2

Aberystwyth Division 3

Aberystwyth Division 4

Aberystwyth Division 5

Aberystwyth Division 6

Aeron

}

Borth

Bow Street

Cardigan North

Cardigan South

Cilcennin

Cwmrheidol

Devil's Bridge

Felinfach

Goginan

Lampeter Borough

Llanarth

Llanbadarn Fawr

Llanddewi Brefi

Llandygwydd

Llandysul North

Llandysul South

Llansysiliogogo

Llanfair Clydogau

Llanfarian

Llanfihangel y Creuddyn

Llangoedmor

Llangeitho

Llangrannog

Llanilar

Llanrhystyd

Llanllwchaiarn

Llansantffraed

Llanwnen

Llanwenog

Lledrod

Nantcwnlle

New Quay

Penbryn

Strata Florida

Taliesin

Talybont

Trefeurig

Tregaron

Troedyraur

Ysbyty Ystwyth

Election of Aldermen
Eight aldermen were elected, including three long-serving members (Peter Jones, J.T. Morgan and C.M. Williams) who had not faced the electorate for many years and five new aldermen, all of whom had been elected at the recent election. D.J. Williams of Tregaron had previously served as an alderman from 1901 until 1907. The two retiring aldermen who had sought election (John Morgan Howell and the Rev T. Arthur Thomas) were not among those appointed for the next six years.

There was some press criticism, notably in the Welsh Gazette, of the Liberal 'caucus', said to be controlled by John Morgan Howell and D.C. Roberts, the veteran member who was elected to the chair for 2022/23, and especially the practice of electing aldermen who had not contested the election.

C. M. Williams, Aberystwyth, 42
Peter Jones, Aberystwyth, 42
J. T. Morgan Talybont, 42
Meredith Gwarnant Williams, Llanwenog, 41
Josiah T. Jones, Llandyssul, 41
D. J. Williams, Tregaron. 42
John Jones, Cilcennin, 42
Richard Evans, Llangoedmor, 41

By-elections
Five by-elections were held following the election of aldermen. At Tregaron, Mary Lloyd became the first woman elected to Cardiganshire County Council when she was returned unopposed. Dr Evan Jones, who had unsuccessfully stood against Meredith Gwarnant Williams at Llanwenog, was returned unopposed at the by-election. Three wards were contested but no party allegiances were declared (although the political allegiances of two of the successful candidates were noted at the 1928 election.

Cilcennin by-election

Llandysul North by-election

Llangoedmor by-election

Llanwenog by-election

Tregaron by-election

References

Sources

1922
1922 Welsh local elections
20th century in Ceredigion